Arrogance is a rock band from Chapel Hill, North Carolina. In the 1970s and early 1980s, they were one of the most popular local bands in the state.

Arrogance made a run of appearances at Raleigh's Village Subway, and were the first group to play some chords at the Pier back in 1973. The group has released six full length albums in its history and an early non-LP single.

In 1983 the group entered a dormant period and the members did not perform together again until 2000, when the band reunited for a few select concerts and gigs in the Triangle area in celebration of Arrogance's 30th anniversary. The most notable was the "Reunion" concert at the North Carolina Museum of Art Amphitheatre in Raleigh in 2000. After large turnouts at the band's 2000 performances, Arrogance began performing again in local clubs, bars, and at special events, averaging about one show a year. The band's current lineup consists of Rod Abernethy, Don Dixon, Scott Davison, Robert Kirkland, and Marty Stout.

History
Arrogance began in a dorm room at the University of North Carolina at Chapel Hill when Don Dixon and Robert Kirkland began singing together in 1969. The band's success has inspired numerous other North Carolinian bands to emerge in search of national fame.

arrogance “one of the architects of the alternative trend of the 1980s”. . All Music Guide

Robert Kirkland and Don Dixon started singing and making music together in an Aycock dorm room at the University of North Carolina, Chapel Hill, in the fall of 1969. It sounded pretty good so, along with Robert's roommate, Mike Greer, and a drummer from East Carolina University, Jimmy Glasgow, they formed a band and began playing. The first sets included an interesting mix of covers from artists like The Beatles, Black Sabbath, Muddy Waters, Cream and Mountain. They dubbed the group Arrogance, a concept of Dixon's referring to their reputation of upstaging other bands. A few months later at Crescent City Studios in Greensboro, the band made its first recording—a 45-rpm single of two original tunes, “Black Death” and “An Estimation”, that was released in the summer. This rare recording has since become a collector's item.

As the artistic partnership between Dixon and Kirkland strengthened, the band personnel changed, with Mike and Jimmy leaving and being replaced by pianist Marty Stout and percussionist Ogie Shaw; with this change the music became more acoustic.

Arrogance's debut album, the self-released, self-produced LP Give Us a Break , came out in 1973. A more acoustic folk style had, by then, replaced the early hard-rock, but the trademark vocals, harmonies and smart lyrics were very much in evidence.

The sound became more upbeat when percussionist Ogie Shaw was replaced by drummer Steve Herbert and the result was Arrogance's second self-labeled LP, Prolepsis, coming out in 1975. The band's wry wit and perspective shows in the record's title, meaning preparation for anticipated things to come, and the music reflected a new level of talent and professionalism, not only in the songs, which were an amalgamation of rock, country and folk, but in the outstanding arrangements and production values of the recording. Late in 1974, before the release of Prolepsis, Steve Herbert left the band and was replaced by Steve Ball Band drummer, Scott Davison.

By now Arrogance was amassing a substantial following of dedicated fans and headlining at regional clubs like Town Hall, The Pier and The Cat's Cradle even though they insisted on playing original music ... unheard of by audiences in those days and unfathomable to club owners, but Arrogance was good enough to make it work. As one fan said, "They could knock you down, not with volume but with sheer intelligence and taste and, really, a sense of history."

Arrogance's strategy of building a regional following and releasing their own music was not only unparalleled, it was radical, but it finally brought them national attention by the end of 1975 when the band signed with Vanguard Records.

Rumors was released in 1976 but unfortunately Vanguard, then a New York City independent label, was ill-equipped to properly support and promote an up-and-coming rock band since its roster was primarily folk artists. And it probably didn't help that, early the following year, Fleetwood Mac released a multi-platinum album using the English spelling of the same title, “Rumours.” But for whatever reasons, Rumors’ launch was less than successful.

Arrogance parted from Vanguard after the one release. By this time folk rock was waning in popularity, so the band changed its focus back to its roots in rock and roll. Rod Abernethy, the final member of Arrogance, joined on lead guitar in 1976. "We needed something to help spice us up a bit," said Scott. And that Rod certainly did, bringing an electric British pop influence to the music.

The addition of Rod pushed the band to its live-performance peak. As Dixon and Robert matured as songwriters, the band's distinctive sound flourished. The harmonies were tight and sophisticated, the music energetic, original and masterfully arranged. Marty had developed an inimitable, indefinable style - an amalgamation of classical and early rock & roll piano with just the right amount of jazz mixed in - that contributed significantly to the band's unique sound. Consistent, steady and always interesting, Scott held the beat, drove the band and kept the rock n’ roll alive, while doubling as Arrogance's comedian and class clown. Arrogance had become a truly great live band and the fans were numerous and loyal. Playing to huge crowds, Arrogance was the most popular band in the region. Describing those days Robert said, "We were enjoying big crowds at that time and it was quite thrilling to be the center of attention. Onstage we still kept it interesting because we never wore anything out by rehearsing it to death." And Dixon agreed, "In the late '70s, we were cranking," adds Dixon. "I was likely to climb up on my amp and scream 'til I passed out."

In 1980, Arrogance signed a label agreement with Warner Brothers new Curb Records division and were off to California to record Suddenly. Again the band's tongue-in-cheek humor shows itself in an album title, since it was far from suddenly that Arrogance was appearing on the national scene. Although this seemed like the long-awaited break, once again the timing was bad. Although the LP was an excellent pop-rock recording with more than one potential single, the label's attention had turned to post-punk power pop and Arrogance was pushed down on their list of priorities (along with the B-52s and the Talking Heads).

Arrogance returned to playing for live audiences when the Warner/Curb relationship failed and recorded a live album documenting their tour on the independent label Moonlight Records in 1981 and entitled it Lively. Included was an EP from the band's alter ego, Dogbreath, containing an eclectic array of upbeat covers from “Wipe Out” to “Wooly Bully.”

In 1982, still trying to find the proper label for their music, the band recorded a stunning mix of twelve new wave-flavored rock and bouncy, soulful pop songs. They distributed the demo under the name of 5’11” (the average of the combined heights of all	the members) hoping the name change might improve their luck, but to no avail.

In October 1983, the group played its last gigs in the North Carolina Triangle area and disbanded. But that was not the end of Arrogance.

In spring of 2000 Dixon, now a well respected producer, engineer, songwriter and performer, decided to re-release the Arrogance recordings on CD for the group's 30th Anniversary. Two Reunion Shows were planned, one May 20 for the group to play its folk-rock repertoire at the Carrboro, N.C., Arts Center, and one June 10 featuring their electric music. Arrogance, N.C.’s greatest rock n’ roll band, took the stage at the North Carolina Museum of Art in Raleigh and played to a packed house.

And they didn't stop there. In August 2002, then Charlotte-based GAFF Music released the long overdue 1982 recordings and a compilation of other previously unreleased Arrogance tunes (including Dixon's pop anthem “Praying Mantis”) as The 5’11” Record to critical acclaim.

“After 20 years have passed, it may amaze the first-time listener that they didn't succeed, since the songwriting quality is so good, with catchy melodies and clever lyrics, the playing is sterling . . . an excellent overview of an unjustly forgotten regional band that deserved better,” wrote William Ruhlmann of "All Music Guide".

Or as entertainment critic Godfrey Cheshire, a long time fan and friend of the band said, "Everybody that gets out there and plays original songs at the Cat's Cradle and puts out their own records is following in Arrogance's footsteps in North Carolina."

On May 13, 2017, the band performed a show at Kings in Raleigh.

Discography
 "Black Death" (single) (1970)
 ”Knights Of Dreams” (Unreleased debut studio album recorded April 1971, officially released 2016 by Numero Group.)
 Give Us a Break (1973)
 Prolepsis (1975)
 Rumors (1976)
 Suddenly (1980)
 Lively (1981)
 The 5'11" Record (2002)

See also
 Music of North Carolina

References

Musical groups from Chapel Hill-Carrboro, North Carolina
Rock music groups from North Carolina